The 1998 Texaco/Havoline 200 was the fourteenth round of the 1998 CART FedEx Champ Car World Series season, held on August 16, 1998, at Road America in Elkhart Lake, Wisconsin. Dario Franchitti won the race, his first career win in CART. The race was also notable for a crash in which Alex Barron ended up on top of Bryan Herta.

Classification

Race

Caution flags

Lap Leaders

Point standings after race

References 

Texaco Havoline 200
Texaco Havoline 200
Texaco Havoline 200
Champ Car Grand Prix of Road America